The NSB El 8 was a Norwegian electric locomotive which was built between 1940 and 1949. Although fast, the El 8 did not have bogies, making it rather stiff in the turns, a problem which was remedied with the introduction of the NSB El 11 and NSB El 13.

There were 16 El 8 engines produced. Four manufacturers were involved in building it: AEG, Norsk Elektrisk & Brown Boveri, Per Kure and Thune. The engines were numbered 8 2054 to 8 2061 and 8 2065 to 8 2072. The last El 8 was retired in 1987. Engine no. 8 2060 is preserved.

References
Jernbane.net entry on the El 8

El 08
15 kV AC locomotives
Brown, Boveri & Cie locomotives
AEG locomotives
Electric locomotives of Norway
Railway locomotives introduced in 1940
Standard gauge locomotives of Norway
1′Do1′ locomotives